The 1976 United States presidential election in New York took place on November 2, 1976. All 50 states and The District of Columbia, were part of the 1976 United States presidential election. Voters chose 41 electors to the Electoral College, which voted for President and Vice President. New York was won by Democratic Georgia Governor Jimmy Carter, in a narrow victory against incumbent Republican President Gerald Ford, who failed to gain the presidency through formal election that year. Carter was running with Minnesota Senator Walter Mondale, and President Ford had selected Kansas Senator Bob Dole. The presidential election of 1976 was a very partisan election in New York, with more than 99% of the electorate voting for either Carter or Ford.

Carter took 51.95% of the popular vote to Ford's 47.52%, a victory margin of 4.43%. New York weighed in as being slightly more Democratic than the national average, by about 2%. The vast majority of counties in New York state were won by the Republican Ford, but the highly populated regions of New York City, Buffalo, and Albany were able to tip the scales for the Democratic Carter.

 Despite Ford being a Northern moderate, the Southerner Carter won commanding victories over Ford in four of the five boroughs of New York City. Carter broke 70% of the vote in Manhattan and the Bronx, and received over 60% of the vote in Brooklyn and Queens. Overall Carter took a citywide vote total of 66.37%, up to that point the third highest vote share ever received by a Democratic presidential candidate in New York City, surpassed only by the nationwide landslide victories of Lyndon B. Johnson in 1964 and Franklin D. Roosevelt in 1936, despite the fact that Carter was only winning a narrow 2-point victory nationwide. The massive raw vote margin in New York City was the vital key to Carter's narrow margin of victory in New York state. One reason for Ford's unusually weak performance in the city was likely his initial refusal to grant the nearly bankrupt city a federal bailout during the city's 1975 fiscal crisis, sparking the infamous New York Daily News headline "Ford to City: Drop Dead." While Ford ultimately would extend federal loans to the city to prevent it from falling into bankruptcy, the damage to Ford's reputation in New York City likely contributed to his poor performance among voters there, and to his narrow loss in both New York state and in the nation overall, as Ford would have won the 1976 election and retained the presidency had he carried New York state.

Even though Ford won in 55 of New York state's 62 counties, Carter's big landslide in massively populated New York City provided Carter with a citywide vote advantage over Ford of 716,717 votes, which was more than twice Carter's statewide victory margin of 288,767 votes. Without the New York City boroughs of Manhattan, Queens, Brooklyn and the Bronx, Ford would have won New York state by 437,078 votes and a 9.7% margin. There was a big difference between the results of Upstate New York and Downstate New York in this election. Ford won Upstate by 11% and Carter won Downstate by 16%,. 

Ford won 50 of the 53 counties in Upstate New York. Carter only won the following three upstate counties: Albany (Albany), Erie (Buffalo), and Sullivan (Monticello). Although Carter won only four of the nine counties in densely populated Downstate New York, he won all four of them by between 21 and 47 percentage points, whereas the five counties in Downstate New York that Ford won all went to him by much smaller margins of between 3 and 9 percentage points.

Carter’s victory in New York was a key to his winning this election. Had Ford carried the state instead, along with all the other states he won, he would have been elected instead with an Electoral College victory of 281 to 256. 

The 1976 Democratic National Convention was held at Madison Square Garden in New York City, in August 1976. At the convention, electors and delegates met for 3 days in New York City before formally nominating Carter to run for the presidency.

Results

Results by county

See also
 United States presidential elections in New York
 Presidency of Jimmy Carter
 Watergate Scandal

Notes

References

 

New York
1976
1976 New York (state) elections